Chapman Square is the debut studio album released by four piece British band Lawson. The album was released on 19 October 2012 via Polydor Records. The album includes their three top ten singles "When She Was Mine", "Taking Over Me" and "Standing in the Dark". The album was mainly produced by John Shanks with Duck Blackwell, Paddy Dalton, Ki Fitzgerald, Carl Falk, and Rami Yacoub.

The album was re-released in the autumn of 2013 as Chapman Square Chapter II, with the lead single from the re-release being "Brokenhearted", which features American rapper B.o.B. As of 2013, the album has sold 169,812 copies.

Background
Guitarist Joel Peat said of the album: "We're all so excited to release our debut album, we've been building up to it for the past four years, and the album's title for us is special, because it is the first place that we played together as a band. Going out on tour to support the album is amazing too. Doing shows in our Hometowns feels like the perfect way to celebrate. Performing live is what we love the most, so to be able to play our biggest venues to date in the cities where we grew up is very special." Lawson have cited many inspirations for their debut album, including Polow da don and Mann. The album's track listing was confirmed by the band via their official website on 24 September 2012.

The album is named after Chapman Square, Southfields, SW19.

Singles
"When She Was Mine" was released as the band's first official single on 27 May 2012, reaching #4 on the UK Singles Chart. Following the single release, the band undertook their second headline tour, in which they visited locations such as Glasgow, Sheffield, Nottingham, London and Birmingham. "Taking Over Me" was released as the band's second single on 5 August 2012. The single performed even better than the band's debut, peaking at #3 on the UK Singles Chart. In support of the single, the band appeared at the Blackberry Summer Daze concert in August 2012. In August 2012, the band announced a Hometown Tour, during which they visited several towns and cities across Britain, including the hometowns of band members Andy, Adam, Ryan. "Standing in the Dark" was revealed as the album's third single in September 2012, before becoming available to purchase from 14 October 2012. The single peaked at #6 on the UK Singles Chart. "Learn to Love Again" was released as the fourth single from the album on 7 February 2013, peaking at #13 on the UK Singles Chart, becoming the least successful single from the album overall. "Brokenhearted", featuring American rapper B.o.B, will be released as the lead single from the repackaged version of the album on 7 July 2013. A version without B.o.B has also been recorded.

Track listing

Chapman Square Chapter II

Notes
 signifies an additional producer
 signifies a vocal producer

Charts

Weekly charts

Year-end charts

Release history

References

2012 debut albums
Polydor Records albums
Albums produced by Polow da Don
Albums produced by Rami Yacoub
Lawson (band) albums